Senator Norton may refer to:

Christopher F. Norton (1821–1880), New York State Senate
Daniel M. Norton (1840s–1918), Virginia State Senate
Daniel Sheldon Norton (1829–1870), Minnesota State Senate and U.S. Senator from Minnesota
Eugene L. Norton (1825–1880), Massachusetts State Senate
John N. Norton (1878–1960), Nebraska State Senate
Michael Norton (politician) (1837–1889), New York State Senate
Otis Norton (1809–1889), Wisconsin State Senate
William Harrison Norton, Missouri State Senate